Indigenous Areas are the administrative divisions in Taiwan with significant populations of Taiwanese indigenous peoples. These areas are granted higher level of local autonomy. Currently there are 55 such divisions.

History 

On 31 October 2001, the Indigenous Peoples Employment Rights Protection Act was promulgated. In order to implement the provisions of the act, the Council of Indigenous Peoples designated 30 mountain indigenous townships and districts and 25 townships and cities as indigenous areas.

List of indigenous areas

See also 
 Taiwanese indigenous peoples
 Administrative divisions of Taiwan
 Township (Taiwan)
 District (Taiwan)

References

External links 
 
 

2001 establishments in Taiwan
Subdivisions of Taiwan
Taiwanese indigenous peoples
Lands reserved for indigenous peoples